Kercher is an English and German family name. Notable people with the name include:

 Bob Kercher (1918–2004), American footballer
 Fritz Kercher, German army officer, recipient of the Knight's Cross
 Meredith Kercher (1985–2007), British student murdered in Perugia, Italy

See also
 Kärcher, a manufacturer of high-pressure cleaners
 McKercher, a surname